Mike Baldwin (born January 15, 1955 in Pasadena, California) is an American former professional motorcycle road racer. He was a top contender in AMA Superbike racing during the 1980s who also competed in Grand Prix motorcycle racing. Baldwin was inducted into the AMA Motorcycle Hall of Fame in 2001.

Baldwin led the American team to an upset win over the favored British team when he was the highest points scorer at the 1979 Transatlantic Trophy match races. The Transatlantic Trophy match races pitted the best British riders against the top American road racers on 750cc motorcycles in a six-race series in England. Baldwin won five AMA Formula 1 titles as well as becoming the first rider to win three Suzuka 8 Hours races.

His best finish in the 500cc world championships was a fourth place in the 1986 season while racing for the Kenny Roberts-Yamaha team. Baldwin seemed poised to become one of the top American road racers, but injuries curtailed his career. He rode a Bimota at the WSBK Championship in 1989, scoring a podium finish in France

In 2001, he was inducted into the AMA Motorcycle Hall of Fame.

Grand Prix career statistics

Points system from 1969 to 1987:

Points system from 1988 to 1992:

(key) (Races in bold indicate pole position; races in italics indicate fastest lap)

References

External links 
Motorcycle Hall of Fame

1955 births
Living people
American motorcycle racers
AMA Superbike Championship riders
Superbike World Championship riders
500cc World Championship riders
Sportspeople from Pasadena, California
People from Darien, Connecticut